Hidehiko (written: 秀彦 or 英彦) is a masculine Japanese given name. Notable people with the name include:

, Japanese musician and songwriter
, Japanese jazz saxophonist and bandleader
, Japanese footballer and manager
, Japanese high jumper
, Japanese boxer
, Japanese mathematician
, Japanese judoka and mixed martial artist
, Japanese clothing designer
, Japanese politician

Japanese masculine given names